Excavations of the Mind is the debut album by Dutch progressive rock band Sky Architect. It is a concept album about the mentally insane. The first four tracks are parts of a 19-minute suite Deep Chasm. The album cover artist, Mark Wilkinson, is well known for his work with Fish, Marillion, Judas Priest, and sometimes Iron Maiden.

Track listing
The Deep Chasm suite is broken into four tracks on the album.

Personnel
Christiaan Bruin- Drums, Vocals (background), Engineer
Tom Luchies- Guitar, Vocals
Rik Van Honk- Synthesizer Keyboards, Vocals (background), Engineer, Mastering, Grand Piano
Guus Van Mierlo- Bass guitar 
Wabe Wieringa- Guitar, Producer, Engineer, Mixing

References

External links
Sky Architect Home: Composing the Clouds
[ Allmusic Guide to Excavations of the Mind]

2010 debut albums
Sky Architect albums